Wenham Magna, also known as Great Wenham, is a village and a civil parish in the Babergh district of Suffolk in eastern England.

The parish also contains the hamlets of Gipsy Row, Vauxhall and Wenham Hill. In 2005 it had a population of 150, increasing to 185 at the 2011 Census.

Wenham Magna is the birthplace of Matthew Hopkins, the infamous witchfinder general. His father, James Hopkins, was a Puritan clergyman and vicar of St John's Church The family at one point held title "to lands and tenements in Framlingham 'at the castle.
James Hopkins was popular with his parishioners, one of whom in 1619 left money to purchase Bibles for his then three children James, John and Thomas.

Church of St John 
The parish church of St John is a Grade II* listed building.

The chancel is 14th-century with a later, timber-framed, south porch. There is a 14th-century nave with north and south porches and a 15th-century west tower of flint with stone dressings. The rest of the church is plastered with only the stone windows exposed. The church has red plain tiled roofs.

References

Notes

Bibliography

External links

Villages in Suffolk
Civil parishes in Suffolk
Babergh District